Saigawa Dam is a dam in the Ishikawa Prefecture of Japan, completed in 1965.

References 

Dams in Ishikawa Prefecture
Dams completed in 1965
Buildings and structures in Kanazawa, Ishikawa